Thyanta custator, the red-shouldered stink bug, is a species of stink bug in the family Pentatomidae. It is found in North America.

Subspecies
These two subspecies belong to the species Thyanta custator:
 Thyanta custator accerra (redshouldered stink bug)
 Thyanta custator spinosa

References

Further reading

External links

 

Articles created by Qbugbot
Insects described in 1803
Pentatomini